The Wassoulou Empire, sometimes referred to as the Mandinka Empire, was a short-lived (1878–1898) empire of West Africa built from the conquests of Malinke ruler Samori Ture and destroyed by the French colonial army.

In 1864, Toucouleur ruler El Hajj Umar Tall died near Bandiagara, leaving the then-dominant Toucouleur Empire tottering and a number of chiefs rushing to break their own pieces away from the newly weakened federation.  By far the most successful among them was Samori Touré of what is now southwestern Guinea.

Army organization
Samori's army was well equipped with European firearms and a complex structure of permanent units.  His army was divided into an infantry wing of sofa (Mandinka for infantry, usually slaves) and a cavalry wing. By 1887, Samori could field 30,000 to 35,000 infantry and about 3,000 cavalry. Infantry were divided into units of 10 to 20 men known as a "se" or "kulu".   Cavalry were divided into bands of 50 horsemen called a "sere". Kulus were under the command of a Kun-Tigui, meaning chief.  Ten kulus equaled a bolo (100–200 men).  The bolo, which in the Banmana language translates to "arm", was strictly an infantry unit. The bolo kun-tigui commanded this unit. Under Samori Ture, the state had its own firearms industry that employed about 300 and 400 blacksmiths. 12 guns were produced a week and roughly 200–300 cartridges a day.

Expansion

Samori's campaign swept first through his neighbors, the Bérété and the Cissé, and then into the Wassoulou region (the border of today's Guinea and Mali).  In 1876, he secured the Buré gold mines, and by 1878, his position was secure enough to officially declare himself faama (military leader) of a new Wassoulou Empire.

Later conquests included Kankan, a key Malinke trading center, and sections of what are now Sierra Leone and northern Côte d'Ivoire.

The Mandingo Wars

From 1880 until his death, Samori's ambition was opposed by the expansion of the French.  He entered into combat with the colonial army, defeating them on several occasions, including a notable victory on 2 April 1882, at Woyowayanko in the face of French heavy artillery.

Nonetheless, Samori was forced to sign several treaties ceding territory to the French between 1886 and 1889. Samori began a steady retreat, but the fall of other resistance armies, particularly Babemba Traoré at Sikasso, permitted the colonial army to launch a concentrated assault against his forces. On 29 September 1898, he was captured  by the French Commandant Goudraud and exiled to Gabon, marking the end of the Wassoulou Empire.

References

Countries in precolonial Africa
Former countries in Africa
Political history of Mali
History of Guinea
19th century in Sierra Leone
French West Africa
States and territories established in 1878
States and territories disestablished in 1898
1878 establishments in Africa
Sahelian kingdoms
1898 disestablishments in Africa
Former empires
Former empires in Africa